Kingsbrook may refer to:

Kingsbrook, Bedford, an area of Bedford in Bedfordshire, England
Kingsbrook, Buckinghamshire, a village near Aylesbury in Buckinghamshire, England
Kingsbrook Jewish Medical Center, a hospital in New York, United States